This list of mills in Bolton lists textile factories which existed at one time or another in the Borough of Bolton, Greater Manchester, England.

From the Industrial Revolution until the 20th century, Bolton was a major centre of textile manufacture, particularly cotton spinning. During this period, Bolton was dominated by large rectangular brick-built factories, many of which still remain today as warehouses or converted for residential or retail use. In 1929 there were 247 cotton mills in the borough and in 2009 a study revealed that 108 had survived in some form. The others had been totally demolished and their sites used for other purposes.

163 mills are listed below according to the Bolton ward in which they stand or once stood. The great majority of the premises listed represent spinning mills, the remainder weaving sheds.

Astley Bridge

Breightmet

Bromley Cross

Crompton

Farnworth

Great Lever

Halliwell

Heaton and Lostock

Horwich and Blackrod

Kearsley

Little Lever and Darcy Lever

Rumworth

Smithills

Tonge with the Haugh

Westhoughton with Chew Moor

Other textile based work places in Bolton

References 
 Grace's Guide (Bolton) (1891)
 Graces Guide (Farnworth) (1891)
 St Marks Encyclopedic Coverage of Bolton's Mills
 
 Worralls Directory, 1871

External links

Photographs of Bolton Mills 

 01
Bolton
Bolton
Buildings and structures in the Metropolitan Borough of Bolton
History of the textile industry
Industrial Revolution in England